The following is a timeline of events pertaining to the Troubles in Dublin, Republic of Ireland.

1969
 5 August – The Ulster Volunteer Force plant their first bomb in the Republic of Ireland, damaging the RTÉ Television Centre in Donnybrook, Dublin. No injuries.
 27 December – The UVF plant a bomb at the Daniel O'Connell statue on O'Connell Street. Little damage was done to the statue but the blast smashed windows in a half-mile radius.
 28 December – The UVF detonate a bomb outside the Garda Síochána central detective bureau in Dublin. The nearby telephone exchange headquarters is suspected to have been the target.
1970
 3 April – Garda Richard Fallon (44) is shot by members of Saor Éire during a robbery of the Royal Bank of Ireland at Arran Quay.
 26 March – A bomb damages an electricity substation in Tallaght. An anonymous letter claimed responsibility on behalf of the UVF.
 2 July – A bomb damages the main Dublin–Belfast railway line at Baldoyle. Gardaí believed it was the work of the UVF.
 13 October – Saor Éire member Liam Walsh (35) is killed in a premature explosion when he and another member Martin Casey are planting a device at a railway line at the rear of McKee army base off Blackhorse Avenue in Dublin.
1971
 17 January -  Daniel O'Connell's tomb in Glasnevin Cemetery is damaged by a Loyalist bomb. No injuries.
 8 February -  The Wolfe Tone statue at St. Stephen's Green is destroyed by a Loyalist bomb. No injuries.
 25 October -  Saor Éire member Peter Graham (26) is shot dead in his flat at 110 Stephen's Green in an internal feud.
 30 December -  Provisional Irish Republican Army (IRA) member Jack McCabe (55) is killed in a premature bomb explosion in a garage, Swords Road, Santry.
1972
 2 February – The British Embassy on Merrion Square is burned down in response to Bloody Sunday. A British-owned insurance office in Dún Laoghaire and Austin Reeds outfitters on Grafton Street are also petrol-bombed. The Thomas Cook travel agency along with the offices of British Airlines and the RAF club on Earlsfort Terrace were also attacked.
 28–29 October – A 12 lb bomb is planted in Connolly Station, Amiens Street by Loyalists but dismantled by the Irish Army before it went off. They are also responsible for leaving firebombs in bedrooms in four Dublin hotels (Wynns, The Gresham, The Skylon and The Crofton).
 26 November – Loyalists plant a bomb outside the rear exit door of the Film Centre Cinema, O'Connell Bridge House injuring 40 people.
 1 December -  Bus driver George Bradshaw (30) and bus conductor Tommy Duffy (23) are killed and 127 injured in the first Loyalist car bomb planted in the Republic close to the CIÉ Depot at Sackville Place off O'Connell Street. A second car bomb explodes 7 minutes before causing massive damage to Liberty Hall and multiple injuries.
1973
 20 January – CIÉ bus conductor Thomas Douglas (25) is killed and 17 injured in Loyalist car bomb in Sackville Place off O'Connell Street. The car used in the bombing had been hijacked at Agnes Street, Belfast.
 3 August – Cashier James Farrell (54) is killed by the IRA during an armed robbery while delivering wages to British Leyland factory, Cashel Road, Crumlin.
 October – The IRA use a hijacked helicopter to free three of their members from the exercise yard of Mountjoy Prison, Dublin. One of those who escaped was Séamus Twomey, then Chief of Staff of the IRA who was later recaptured in December 1977.
1974
 17 May – Dublin and Monaghan bombings — Three no-warning bombs explode in Parnell Street, Talbot Street, and South Leinster Street during rush hour; 26 people and an unborn child are killed. Over 300 are injured. Italian restaurant owner Antonio Magliocco (37) and a French-born Jewish woman Simone Chetrit (30) are amongst those killed.
1975
 22 March – The funeral of IRA member Tom Smith, shot dead during an escape attempt from Portlaoise Prison on St. Patrick's Day, is attacked by Gardaí. Three people, including a press photographer, are injured.
 11 September – An off-duty Garda, Michael Reynolds (30), is shot dead in St. Anne's Park by two Anarchists ,Noel and Marie Murray, former members of Official Sinn Féin, following an armed robbery at the Bank of Ireland, Killester.
 2 October – Official IRA member Billy Wright (35) is shot by members of the organisation in his brother's hair salon on the Cabra Road. He died in hospital on 19 October. He was targeted after he made a statement to Gardaí, implicating a prominent member of the Official IRA, about an armed robbery in Heuston Station that occurred in September 1973.
 8 November – Two Loyalist bombs at the arrival terminal at Dublin Airport injure eight and kill John Hayes (30), an Aer Rianta employee.
1976
 February – A 25 lb bomb explodes in the Shelbourne Hotel along with eight incendiary bombs in department stores and shops in the Grafton Street and Henry Street areas. There were no injuries. Loyalists were blamed.
 21 July – Christopher Ewart-Biggs (55), British Ambassador to Ireland, and Private Secretary to the Permanent Under-Secretary of the Northern Ireland Office Judith Cooke (26) are killed by an IRA-planted land mine outside his official residence at Glencairn estate, Sandyford, South Dublin.
1977
 7 September – John Lawlor (38), a suspected informer, is killed by the IRA in Timmons Bar (later called Leonard's), on the corner of Watling Street and Victoria Quay.
 5 October – INLA Chief of Staff and leader of the IRSP Seamus Costello (38) is shot dead in his car on North Strand Road by OIRA member James Flynn.
1979
 28 January – English salesman Arthur Lockett (29) is found dead in Ticknock in the Dublin mountains. He had been beaten with clubs by a number of men and left for dead. Lockett had been boasting in a pub that he had connections in the British Army. It emerged he had worked in West Germany for a time where he had business deals with both American and British army personnel at NATO bases.
1981
 24 March – Members of Revolutionary Struggle shoot and injure Geoffrey Armstrong, the chairman of British vehicle-manufacturing company British Leyland and director of the Confederation of British Industry, while he gives a lecture in Trinity College. Before shooting, the gunmen shouted: "Everybody freeze, nobody move! This action is in support of the H-Blocks''
 18 July – 15,000 strong demo in support of the hunger strikers clashes with 1,500 Gardaí close to the British Embassy in Ballsbridge. 200 people are injured, including 150 Gardaí. Dozens are arrested and 1 million pounds worth of damage is caused.
1982
 19 February – Garda Patrick Reynolds (23) is shot dead by an INLA member at 33 Avonbeg Gardens, Tallaght. Reynolds and four other police officers had burst into the flat where a group of armed INLA men were counting money from a recent bank robbery.
 4 June – Senior Official IRA member James Flynn (40) is shot dead by the INLA outside Cusack's pub, North Strand Road close to where he had killed Seamus Costello five years previously.
1983
 25 March – Brian Stack (47), chief prison officer at Portlaoise prison, is shot by the IRA while walking along South Circular Road, shortly after leaving a boxing contest at the National Stadium. He dies in hospital on 29 September 1984.
 24 November -  Don Tidey, an American supermarket executive, is kidnapped outside his home in Rathfarnham. He was rescued on 16 December after being held captive for 23 days.
1985
 20 August – Tyrone businessman Seamus McEvoy (46), a building contractor for the British Army and Royal Ulster Constabulary, is shot dead by the IRA at his home on Eglinton Road, Donnybrook. A statement said he had been repeatedly warned against doing work for the security forces but continued to supply materials and temporary huts for barracks and military border posts.
1986
 22 March – A member of the Garda Special Branch fires shots into the air on Prince's Street North off O'Connell Street following scuffles while Gardaí rearrest Irish Republican Eibhlinn Glenholmes after a much-publicised extradition battle.
 8 November – UFF plant four small four explosive devices in O'Connell Street. No injuries.
1987
 February – The UDA plant incendiary bombs in a cinema and cafe in Middle Abbey Street, a bonded warehouse in Mabbot Lane and a bookshop in Talbot Street. Only the device in the warehouse exploded but caused little damage.

1991
 February – Loyalists plant two crude incendiary bombs in an O'Connell Street department store. They fail to go off.
1993
 18 September – On the day of the All-Ireland hurling final, Loyalists claim responsibility for planting a small bomb and cutting communication cables near to Store Street Garda station.
1994
 5 January – Two members of the Irish Army bomb disposal unit are injured when a parcel bomb sent by the UVF to the Sinn Féin offices in Dublin exploded during examination at Cathal Brugha barracks.
 21 May – IRA member Martin Doherty (35) was shot dead by UVF gunmen in Widow Scanlon's pub, Pearse Street after preventing two loyalist bombers entering a Sinn Féin fundraiser. A second doorman, Paddy Burke, was shot in the throat but survived. The gunmen left the scene in a car driven by a third man, leaving behind the holdall which contained an 18 lb bomb. The bomb's detonator exploded as people attended to Doherty and Burke but the main explosives failed to ignite. <http://www.anphoblacht.com/contents/23067>
 18 August – Prominent Dublin criminal Martin Cahill (45), known as The General, is shot dead in his car by the IRA at the road junction where Oxford Road meets Charleston Road in Rathmines. The IRA alleged that Cahill had connections to the UVF and had sold the group stolen paintings.
 21 September – The UVF planted a 1.5 kg bomb on the Belfast–Dublin train. It partially exploded as the train neared Dublin Connolly railway station, wounding two people.

References
NI Conflict Archive on the Internet

The Troubles (Northern Ireland)
History of Dublin (city)